MEIKO Maschinenbau GmbH & Co. KG is a German company located in Offenburg specializing in machine construction and iron foundry. The group has more than 2,000 employees, with a revenue of €260 million, as of 2013.

References

Companies based in Baden-Württemberg
Manufacturing companies of Germany
Offenburg